Valentina Khalzova is a Kazakhstani amateur boxer. She won a gold medal at the 2016 World Championships and bronze at the 2022 edition.

References

External links 

Living people
Year of birth missing (living people)
Place of birth missing (living people)
Kazakhstani women boxers
Welterweight boxers
Light-middleweight boxers
AIBA Women's World Boxing Championships medalists
21st-century Kazakhstani women